Hetan Shah is the chief executive of the British Academy and a visiting professor at King's College London. He served as executive director of the Royal Statistical Society from 2011 to 2019.

Early life and education 
Shah studied philosophy, politics and economics at the University of Oxford and graduated in 1996. He earned a postgraduate diploma at Nottingham Law School and a master's degree in history and politics at Birkbeck, University of London. He earned a further postgraduate certificate in economics at Birkbeck, University of London in 2003.

Career 
Shah is Chief Executive of the British Academy, the UK's national academy for humanities and social sciences. He began this role in February 2020. 

Shah served as executive director of the Royal Statistical Society from 2011 to 2019. Under his leadership the society developed several new initiatives, including the celebration of Statistics of the Year, the Data Manifesto and the development of Statistical Ambassadors. The 10-point data manifesto was published after the 2015 election, intended to communicate the significance of certain statistics with politicians and the general public. The manifesto emphasised the need to use reliable evidence in public debate. Statistical Ambassadors act to support charities and the media, pairing them with statisticians trained in public engagement. 

Shah called for more care to be taken when companies disclose their gender pay gap; claiming that some could be "gaming the system" by incorrectly reporting  their mandatory declarations. He has also called for the Public Administration and Constitutional Affairs Select Committee to stop having evidence sessions that consistently feature all male panels. In 2018 he worked with the Institute and Faculty of Actuaries to investigate the implications of big data. Shah believes that the public may become mistrustful of commercial use of their data in the same way they queried genetically modified food. 

In 2019 it was announced that Shah would join the British Academy as Chief Executive in 2020.

Non executive roles 
He is a Board member of the Our World in Data website which provides long run datasets on global issues and of the Legal Education Foundation, a philanthropic body that works on strengthening justice. Shah serves on a number of advisory boards including for the Resolution Foundation, the Bennett Institute for Public Policy at Cambridge University, and UCL's Public Policy Lab. 

Shah helped to found and went on to serve as Vice Chair of the Ada Lovelace Institute between 2018 and 2022. He served as Chair of the Friends Provident Foundation, a grant-making foundation from 2016-2020. The Ada Lovelace Institute is a research body that looks to ensure all data and artificial intelligence serves to benefit all members of society. The think-tank was established after a Royal Statistical Society workshop on big data, when participants questioned what ethics and governance organisations could use. The Ada Lovelace Institute support both the public and private sector, and are independent of government or corporate interests. The Friends Provident foundation is a grant making trust that looks to promote a more fair and resilient economy. 

He is a Visiting Professor at King's College London and was a member of the IPPR Commission on Economic Justice. He was also a member of the independent Social Metrics Commission chaired by Baroness Phillipa Stroud which recommended a new way of measuring poverty in the UK.  He has served on a number of other boards including as a trustee of St George's House (Windsor Castle), the Science Media Centre's advisory board, the Office for National Statistics Data Science Campus advisory board, and the management board of the Sir Lenny Henry Centre for Media Diversity.

Articles 
He has written on a range of subjects:

- Innovation (FT)

- Productivity (Guardian)

- UK R&D and risk funding (CityAM)

- Importance of humanities and social sciences (Nature)

- AI in public policy (FT)

- Measuring poverty (CityAM)

- Artificial intelligence in the world of work (CIPD)

References 

Living people
Year of birth missing (living people)
British chief executives
Academics of King's College London
Alumni of the University of Oxford
Alumni of Birkbeck, University of London